Guy Dufour (born 14 March 1987) is a Belgian footballer who currently plays for Roeselare in the Belgian First Division B as a central midfielder.

Club career

PSV 
Guy Dufour played for PSV jeugd (youngster) as a schoolboy since 2001. He had gained a constant promotion each year. In 2005, he was promoted to PSV Jong (the highest grade among jeugd) and was constantly assigned as the captain. In the same year, he was given the shirt no.32 in the first team and was highly profiled among his reserves teammates. However, he was unable to gain a place in the first team and was finally sold to FC Volendam in the end of 05/06 season.

Over the six years at PSV Eindhoven, he has followed the team to a number of countries for competitions, for example, the Hong Kong International Soccer 7 2006 held in May.

Timeline:
'00-'01 Team C2
'01-'02 Team C1  
'02-'03 Team B1  
'03-'04 Team A1  
'04-'05 Team A1  
'05-'06 Jong PSV

FC Eindhoven 
Dufour signed with FC Eindhoven in January 2008 on a contract lasting until the mid of 2008.

Lommel United 
Following his contract with the Eerste Divisie club expired, Dufour returned to Belgium and later joined Second Division side Lommel United in July 2008. He wore jersey number 8 and spent three season with the club as a regular player.

Standard de Liège 
On 27 April 2011, Royal Standard de Liège announced that he had signed a two-year contract and an option for a further two-year and would join in the summer transfer window.

Sources 
PSVjeugd
PSVjeugd in Hong Kong
PSV official Site
FC Volendam Official Site

Specific

External links
 

1987 births
Living people
Belgian footballers
Challenger Pro League players
Belgian expatriate footballers
Eerste Divisie players
FC Eindhoven players
FC Volendam players
Sint-Truidense V.V. players
K.A.S. Eupen players
Lommel S.K. players
Royal Antwerp F.C. players
Standard Liège players
K.S.V. Roeselare players
K.F.C. Dessel Sport players
Expatriate footballers in the Netherlands
People from Mol, Belgium
Association football midfielders
Footballers from Antwerp Province